The Rural Municipality of Pleasantdale No. 398 is a rural municipality (RM) in the Canadian province of Saskatchewan within Census Division No. 14 and  Division No. 4.

History 
The RM of Pleasantdale No. 398 incorporated as a rural municipality on December 11, 1911.

Geography

Communities and localities 
The following urban municipalities are surrounded by the RM.

Towns
 Naicam

Villages
 Pleasantdale

The following unincorporated communities are within the RM

Localities
 Chagoness
 Kipabiskau, dissolved as a village, April 30, 1973
 Lac Vert
 Silver Park

Demographics 

Attractions 
 Naicam Museum
 Lake Charron
Lake Charron Regional Park
 Kipabiskau Regional Park

Government 
The RM of Pleasantdale No. 398 is governed by an elected municipal council and an appointed administrator that meets on the second Thursday of every month. The reeve of the RM is Fred Graham while its administrator is Debra Parry. The RM's office is located in Naicam.

Transportation 
 Saskatchewan Highway 6
 Saskatchewan Highway 349
 Saskatchewan Highway 773
 Saskatchewan Highway 777
 Canadian Pacific Railway
 Naicam Airport

See also 
List of rural municipalities in Saskatchewan

References 

P